This article lists political parties in Tajikistan. Tajikistan is a one party dominant state with the People's Democratic Party of Tajikistan in power. Opposition parties are allowed, but are widely considered to have no real chance of gaining power.

Parties represented in Parliament

Parties not represented in Parliament

 Justice Party (Hizbi Adolatkhoh)
 Lali Badakhshan
 Social Democratic Party (Hizbi Sotsial-Demokratii Tojikiston)

Banned parties

 Hizb ut-Tahrir
 Islamic Renaissance Party of Tajikistan (Hizbi Nahzati Islomii Tojikiston)
 Forum of Tajik Freethinkers
 Reforms and Development in Tajikistan
 Association of Central Asian Migrants

See also
 Politics of Tajikistan
 List of political parties by country

Tajikistan
 
Political parties
Political parties
Tajikistan